Trescault is a commune in the Pas-de-Calais department in the Hauts-de-France region of France.

Geography

Population

Places of interest
 The church of St. Martin, rebuilt, as with much of the village, after the First World War.
 The Commonwealth War Graves Commission cemeteries.

See also
 Communes of the Pas-de-Calais department

References

External links

 The CWGC communal cemetery
 Ribecourt Road CWGC cemetery

Communes of Pas-de-Calais